This is a list of ice cores drilled for scientific purposes.  Note that many of these locations are on moving ice sheets, and the latitude and longitude given is as of the date of drilling.

Africa

Antarctica

Asia

Mainland and arctic islands

Southeast Asia

Europe

Alps

Iceland

Scandinavia

Spitzbergen

North America

Canada

Greenland

United States

Oceania

New Zealand

South America

Bolivia

Peru

See also

List of Arctic research programs
List of research stations in the Arctic
Research stations in Antarctica

Notes

References

Sources 
 
 
 
 
 
 
 
 
 
 
 
 
 
 
 
 
 
 
 
 
 
 
 
 
 
 
 
 
 
 
 
 
 
 
 
 
 
 
 
 
 
 
 
 
 
 
 
 
 
 
 

Glaciology
Science-related lists
Geology-related lists